Iniabasi Samuel Henshaw, professionally known as Samm Henshaw (born 22 February 1994), is an English singer, songwriter, and record producer. Henshaw garnered mainstream radio support from BBC Radio 1 and was chosen by James Bay, Chance the Rapper, and Allen Stone for tour support. His debut album, Untidy Soul, was released on January 28, 2022.

Early life
Henshaw was born in London, England, and was raised by Nigerian parents in South London.  

Henshaw spent his secondary years at Cleeve Park School, then pursued a popular music performance degree at Southampton Solent.

Career

2014–2015: Debut EP The Sound Experiment
Henshaw's debut EP, The Sound Experiment, was released in 2015 and featured production and songwriting input from Wayne Hector and Fred Cox, amongst others.

2016: The Sound Experiment 2
Henshaw's second EP, The Sound Experiment 2, was released in the summer of 2016. Henshaw released music videos for "Our Love" and "Night Calls", promotional singles from The Sound Experiment 2.

2022: Untidy Soul 
After releasing the singles Still Broke (featuring Keyon Harrold), Grow, and Chicken Wings, Henshaw released his debut album Untidy Soul. Critics stated the album was based on "rootsy, old-school soul, 90s hip-hop, bluesy jazz and gospel," with Henshaw calling it "a reflection of his own 'scatterbrain", each song telling a different story.

Artistry

Alongside gospel artists Helen Baylor, Fred Hammond, Israel Houghton, and Alvin Slaughter, Henshaw is said to have spent his childhood devouring mainstream pop music, from Stevie Wonder and Michael Jackson to Usher and N*Sync. More recently, Henshaw identifies his biggest vocal inspirations as D’Angelo, Paolo Nutini, and Lauryn Hill, and finds songwriting inspiration in Grammy award winner Frank Ocean.

Tours
Supporting
James Bay – Chaos and the Calm Tour (2015)
Tori Kelly – Where I Belong Tour (2016)
Chance the Rapper – Magnificent Coloring World Tour (2016)
Allen Stone – Building Balance Tour (2020)

Discography

Studio albums

Extended plays

Singles
2018: "How Does It Feel?"
2018: "Broke"
2018: "Doubt" (feat. Wretch 32)
2019: "Church" (feat. EarthGang)
2019: "The World Is Mine"
2019: "Only One to Blame"
2020" "Change for Me" (with Brasstracks)
2020: "All Good"
2021: "Still Broke" (feat. Keyon Harrold)
2021: "Grow"
2021: "Chicken Wings"

Guest appearances

References

External links

 

1994 births
Living people
21st-century Black British male singers
Alumni of Solent University
Black British male rappers
British contemporary R&B singers
English people of Nigerian descent
Singers from London
Columbia Records artists